"On the Death of Mr. Crashaw" is an elegy by English poet Abraham Cowley in commemoration of his friend Richard Crashaw death. First published in 1656, it is considered by literary critics as one of Cowley's greatest poems.

Synopsis
The poem celebrates the life of Richard Crashaw, who is described as "Poet and Saint". The narrator suggests that Crashaw's poems have a heavenly quality. He remarks that his "songs" bring poetry "nobly back to their Holy Land" and that they will be sung with the angel "ayres divine".

Analysis
David Trotter writes that the opening lines single "(Crashaw) out from the throng of profane poets", whereas throughout the rest of the poem, Crashaw "saintliness" is contrasted with the "weaker—sometimes false—codes" and "relative homelessness" of the narrator. For instance, the narrator expresses his "despair at the single dimension of modern concerns" due to the use of the "weak parenthesis" in "(Vain men!)". N. K. Sugimura suggests that Cowley "may well have been paying homage to how Crashaw lived appropriation of Counter-Reformation spirituality had succeeded in raising his particular strain of English devotional poetry." The poem also alludes to the Catholic "shrine" in Loretto at which Crashaw worked as a Catholic poet for merely three months before his death; Crashaw had previously been secretary to Italian Cardinal Giovanni Battista Maria Pallotta under the recommendation of Henrietta Maria.

Publication history
Richard Crashaw died on 21 August 1649. According to Cowley's biographer Arthur Nethercot, "On the Death of Mr. Crashaw" was only written some two years after Crashaw's death. The completed elegy was included as the final and most recent poem in Miscellanies, published in 1656.

Reception
The elegy has been considered to be one of Cowley's "finest poems". According to Jelena Krostovic, it is "universally admired for its stately mood". Reportedly one of his "clear personal favourites" among the poems in Miscellanies, Samuel Johnson wrote that it "apparently excels" all the other poems in the collection, adding that it contains "beauties which common authors
may justly think not only above their attainment, but above their ambition." John Buxton called the poem "sensitive and judicious". 

In Epistle III of An Essay on Man, Alexander Pope denounces religious partisanship. He writes that one "can't be wrong whose life is in the right", alluding to Cowley's "tolerant" comment in "On the Death of Mr. Crashaw" that Crashaw's Catholicism may have "harmlessly diverged" from Cowley's "Mother Church": "His Faith perhaps in some nice Tenets might/Be wrong; his Life, I'm sure, was in the right".

References

Citations

Works cited

External links
 
 

1650s poems
1656 works